Traga is the third album by the Chilean band Fiskales Ad-Hok, launched in 1995 under "Culebra Records", BMG sub-label. After releasing this album, Fiskales Ad-Hok decide they do not feel comfortable in their workplace, so I founded an independent record label themselves, CFA - Autonomous Phonographic Corporation - under which throw all his later works.

Track listing
 Río Abajo
 Carlitos Jesús
 Perra
 No estar Aquí
 Algo
 Gris
 Eugenia
 El perro del Regimiento
 Fuga
 El Circo
 Tevito
 Con Nuestras Manos
 Banderitas y Globos

Personnel
Álvaro España – vocals
Vibora – guitar
Micky – drums
Roly Urzua – bass

References

Fiskales Ad-Hok albums
Spanish-language albums
1995 albums
Bertelsmann Music Group albums